Oak Creek Hills is an unincorporated community in El Dorado County, California. It lies at an elevation of 591 feet (180 m).

References

Unincorporated communities in California
Unincorporated communities in El Dorado County, California